Ric Mathias (born December 10, 1975) was a player in the US National Football League for the Cincinnati Bengals in 1998 as a defensive back.

Biography
Mathias was born on December 10, 1975, in Monroe, Wisconsin. He attended Monroe High School. He played football at the University of Wisconsin–La Crosse. Before joining the Cincinnati Bengals, he was with the Indianapolis Colts earlier in 1998. He sat out the entire 1999 season because of a knee injury.

References

Cincinnati Bengals players
People from Monroe, Wisconsin
Players of American football from Wisconsin
Wisconsin–La Crosse Eagles football players
1975 births
Living people